This is a chronological bibliography of books (with a few pamphlets) by the author Hilaire Belloc. His books of verse went through many different editions, and are not comprehensively covered.

To 1909
 Verses and Sonnets (1896) poems, Ward and Downey.
 The Bad Child's Book of Beasts (1896) poems, Basil Temple Blackwood (B.T.B.) illustrator
 More Beasts for Worse Children (1897) poems, B. T. B. illustrator
 The Modern Traveller (1898) poems, B. T. B. illustrator
 Danton; a study (1899)
 Paris, its Sites, Monuments and History (1898) with Maria Hornor Lansdale
 A Moral Alphabet (1899) poems, B. T. B. illustrator
 Paris (1900)
 Lambkin's remains (1900)
 Robespierre (1901)
 The Path to Rome (1902) non-fiction (a travel book enhanced by numerous digressions)
 The Great Inquiry; faithfully reported by Hilaire Belloc and ornamented with sharp cuts drawn on the spot by G. K. Chesterton (1903)
 Caliban's Guide to Letters (1903) also The Aftermath or, Gleanings from a busy life
 Emmanuel Burden, Merchant (1904) novel
 Avril: essays on the French Renaissance (1904) criticism
 The Old Road: from Canterbury to Winchester (1904)
 Hills and the Sea (1906)
 Sussex (1906) illustrations by Wilfrid Ball
 Esto Perpetua: Algerian Studies and Impressions (1906) travel
 Cautionary Tales for Children (1907) poems, B. T. B. illustrator
 The Historic Thames (1907)
 Mr. Clutterbuck's Election (1908) novel
 On Nothing and Kindred Subjects  (1908) essays
 On Everything (1909) essays
 The Eye-Witness (1908)
 A Change in the Cabinet (1909) novel
 Marie Antoinette (1909) non-fiction
 The Pyrenees (1909)

1910 – 1919
 Pongo and the Bull (1910) novel
 Catholicism and Socialism: Second Series (1910) essays, with Joseph Rickaby and others
 On Anything (1910) essays
 On Something (1910) essays
 Verses (1910)
 The Party System (1911) non-fiction (with Cecil Chesterton)
 More Peers (1911) poems, B. T. B. illustrator
 The Four Men: A Farrago (1911) novel
 The French Revolution (1911) non-fiction
 The Girondin (1911) novel
 First and last (1911) essays
 British Battles: Blenheim (1911) Turcoing (1912), Crécy (1912), Waterloo (1912), Malplaquet, Poitiers (1913); as Six British Battles 1931, 1951
 The Servile State (1912) politics/economics
 The Green Overcoat (1912) novel
 The River of London (1912)
 This and That and the Other (1912) essays
 The History of England (1912) with John Lingard, 11 volumes, and later versions in the 1920s
 The Romance of Tristan and Iseult (1913) translation of Joseph Bédier's 1900 work
 The Stane Street: a monograph (1913)
 Warfare in England (1913)
 The Book of the Bayeux tapestry (1914)
 Land & Water; The World's War Vol. II (Parts 14 to 26) (1914) magazine, also in hard covers
 The History of England (1915) non-fiction
 The Two Maps of Europe (1915) non-fiction
 A Change in the Cabinet (1915)
 A General Sketch of the European War, the First Phase (1915)
 A Picked Company, being a selection from the writings of H. Belloc (1915), ed. E. V. Lucas
 At the Sign of the Lion (1916) essays (US)
 The last days of the French monarchy (1916)
 A General Sketch of the European War, The Second Phase (1916)
 The Free Press (1918)

1920 – 1929
 Europe And The Faith (1920) non-fiction
 The House of Commons and Monarchy (1920)
 The Jews (1922) later editions 1928, 1937
 The Mercy of Allah (1922)
 The Road (1923)
 The Contrast (1923)
 On (1923) essays
 Economics for Helen (1924) distributism
 The Cruise of the Nona (1925)
 This and that and the other (1925) essays
 Mr. Petre (1925) novel
 The French Revolution (1925)
 The Campaign of 1812 and the Retreat from Moscow (1925)
 A Companion to Mr. Wells's "Outline of History"  (1926)
 Mr. Belloc Still Objects (1926)
 The Catholic Church and History (1926)
 Short Talks with the Dead and others (1926) Cayme Press
 The emerald of Catherine the Great (1926)
 Essays of Today and Yesterday (1926)
 Miniatures of French History (1926)
 Mrs. Markham's New History of England (1926)
 The Highway and Its Vehicles (1926) edited by Geoffrey Holme
 Oliver Cromwell (1927) non-fiction
 The Haunted House (1927) novel
 Towns of Destiny (1927)
 Do We Agree?: A Debate Between G. K. Chesterton And Bernard Shaw, with Hilaire Belloc in the Chair (1928)
 Many Cities (1928) travel
 M. Wells et Dieu. Des poèmes et des essais  (1928) with Maurice Beerblock, A. Beucler, Pierre Colle, Elie Gothchaux, Robert Honnert, Georges Hugnet, Mercédès de Gournay, Max Jacob, Jean de Menasce, Eugenio d'Ors, Paul Sabon
 James II (1928) non-fiction
 But Soft - We Are Observed! (1928) novel (Shadowed! US)
 How the Reformation Happened (1928)
 Belinda: a tale of affection in youth and age (1928) novel
 A Conversation with an Angel: and other essays (1928)
 The Chanty of the Nona (1928) Faber and Gwyer, Ariel Poems #9
 The Missing Masterpiece (1929) novel
 Richelieu (1929) non-fiction
 Survivals and New Arrivals: The Old and New Enemies of the Catholic Church (1929)

1930 – 1939
 The Man Who Made Gold (1930) novel
 Wolsey (1930) non-fiction
 The Catholic Church and Current Literature (1930) George N. Shuster, editor Hilaire Belloc (and other books of the Calvert Series)
 Joan of Arc (1929)
 Pauline - Favorite Sister of Napoleon (1930)
 New Cautionary Tales (1930) poems
 Essays of a Catholic Layman in England (1931)
 A Conversation with a Cat: and others (1931)
 Cranmer (1931) non-fiction
 On Translation (Oxford: Clarendon, 1931) Taylorian Lecture, 1931
 Hilaire Belloc (Augustan books of Modern Poetry) 1931
 One Hundred and one Ballades (1931) with E. C. Bentley G. K. Chesterton C.K. Scott-Moncrieff, Winifred Agar, Sidney Allnutt, Maurice Baring, Cecil Chesterton, Geoffrey Howard, Diggory King, H. S. Mackintosh
 Nine Nines or Novenas from a Chinese Litany of Odd Numbers (1931)
 Napoleon (1932) non-fiction
 The Postmaster General (1932) novel
 Saulieu Of The Morvan (1932)
 The Question and the Answer (1932)
 Ladies and Gentlemen: For Adults Only and Mature at That (1932) poems
 An Heroic Poem in Praise of Wine (1932) Curwen Press
 Charles the First, King of England (1933)
 William the Conqueror (1933)
 Below bridges (1933)
 The Tactics and Strategy of the Great Duke of Marlborough (1933)
 How We Got The Bible (1934) pamphlet
 A Shorter History of England (1934)
 Milton (1935) non-fiction
 Hilaire Belloc (1935) edited by E. V. Knox, Methuen Library of Humour
 Characters Of The Reformation (1936) non-fiction
 The Restoration Of Property (1936) non-fiction
 The hedge and the horse (1936)
 The Battleground: Syria and Palestine, The Seedplot of Religion (1936)
 The County of Sussex (1936)
 The Crisis Of Our Civilisation (1937) non-fiction
 The Crusades : The World's Debate (1937)
 An Essay on the Nature of Contemporary England (1937) (What England Really Is US)
 Stories, essays, poems (1938) edited by Ernest Rhys
 Monarchy: a study of Louis XIV (1938)
 Return to the Baltic (1938)
 The Great Heresies (1938) 
 The Church and Socialism (1938)
 The Case of Dr. Coulton (1938)
 On sailing the sea; a collection of seagoing writings (1939) selected by W. N. Roughead
 The Last Rally: A Story of Charles II (1939) non-fiction

1940 – 1953
 The Silence Of The Sea and Other Essays (1940)
 On the Place of Gilbert Chesterton in English Letters (1940)
 The Catholic and the War (1940)
 The Alternative (1940) distributist pamphlet
 Elizabethan Commentary (1942) (Elizabeth, Creature of Circumstance US)
 Places (1942)
 Sonnets and Verse (1945)
 The Romance of Tristan and Iseult by Joseph Bedier (1945) translated by Belloc and Paul Rosenfeld
 Selected Essays (1948) edited by J. B. Morton
 An Anthology of his Prose and Verse (1951) selected by W. N. Roughead
 World Conflict (1951) booklet
 Songs of the South Country (1951) selected poems

Posthumous
 Belloc Essays (1955) edited by Anthony Forster
 The Verse of Hilaire Belloc (1954) Nonesuch Press, edited W. N. Roughead
 One Thing and Another. A Miscellany from his Uncollected Essays selected by Patrick Cahill (1955)
 Collected Verse (1958)
 Letters From Hilaire Belloc (1958) selected by Robert Speaight
 Advice: Hilaire Belloc's advice on wine, food and other matters (1960)
 Complete Verse (1970) Duckworth
 Belloc: A Biographical Anthology (1970) edited by Herbert Van Thal and Jane Soames Nickerson
 Hilaire Belloc's Prefaces (1971) editor J. A. De Chantigny
 Distributist Perspectives: Essays On Economics of Justice And Charity (2004) with Herbert W. Shove, George Maxwell, G. K. Chesterton, Arthur J. Penty, H. J. Massingham, Eric Gill, and Harold Robbins
 Cautionary Tales for Children, illustrated by Edward Gorey (2002) Harcourt, Inc.
 The Way Out (2006) Catholic Authors Press

References

External links
 

Bibliographies by writer
Bibliographies of British writers
Bibliographies of French writers
Poetry bibliographies
Christian bibliographies